A dust lane consists of a relatively dense, obscuring clouds of interstellar dust, observed as a dark swath against the background of a brighter object(s), especially a galaxy. These dust lanes can usually be seen in spiral galaxies, such as the Milky Way, when viewed from the edge. Due to the dense and relatively thick nature of this dust, light from the galaxy is reduced by several magnitudes. In the Milky Way, this attenuation of visible light makes it impossible to see the stars behind the Great Rift through the bulge around the Galactic Center from Earth. This dust, as well as the gasses also found within these lanes, mix and combine to form stars and planets.

See also
 Interplanetary medium
 Interplanetary dust
 Interstellar dust
 Intergalactic dust
 Extinction (astronomy)
 Star formation

References

Interstellar media
Cosmic dust